Michael Mercer may refer to:

Mike Mercer (shot putter) (born 1947), Canadian shot putter in 1981 Pacific Conference Games
Mike Mercer (basketball) (born 1986), American basketball player
Mike Mercer (American football) (born 1935), former American college and professional football kicker and punter
Mick Mercer, journalist and author